Dungeon Master II: The Legend of Skullkeep, also released as Dungeon Master II: Skullkeep, is the sequel to the dungeon crawler role-playing video game Dungeon Master. It was released in 1993 in Japan and in 1995 in other countries. It is available for DOS, Amiga, Macintosh, Sega CD, PC-9801, PC-9821, and FM Towns. A Sega Mega Drive version was planned but never released.

Platform comparison

Graphics: There are many graphical differences between the DOS and Amiga versions. For example, the title and endgame animations are very different. Items graphics also change: the Amiga version, while marked as an AGA game, is actually running in 32 color ECS mode (evident by the fact that it runs on Amiga 600 computers with 2MB RAM) colors, whereas the DOS version has 256 color VGA graphics. While the PC-9821 has 256 color graphics, the PC-9801 version uses dithered graphics to fit within the PC-9801's palette.

Screen layouts: The Macintosh version includes two screen layouts: a normal and a compact layout.

Music: The game music is different in each version of the game: the PC version uses MIDI music (which therefore sounds different on different sound cards), the Amiga version uses MODules, and the Sega CD version uses CD Audio tracks.

Reception

Dungeon Master II received mediocre reviews and sold poorly. Reviewing the Sega CD version, GamePro commented that the standard Genesis controller does not work well with its point-and-click interface, and that a Sega Mouse is needed to fully enjoy the game. They also criticized the need to maintain light sources and food supplies. However, the bulk of their review was devoted to praise for the enemy AI, which they contended is so intelligent and naturalistic that it's "almost like playing against another person." Reviewing the later PC version, a Next Generation critic said that while the original Dungeon Master was an outstanding game, Dungeon Master II retained aspects of the original that had long since become outdated. Noting the "refreshingly different magic system" as one of the few bright points, he gave it two out of five stars.

British gaming magazine The One gave the Amiga version of Dungeon Master II an overall score of 93%, stating that "The game is simply superb and it will really draw you in ... This is a game that has more atmosphere than you can wave a stick at. It's a sort of first person adventure game that will draw you in like never before ... The sound is totally amazing, helping to create a stunning overall effect. It is 3D sound that really does simulate distance and direction." The One compares the first-person perspective to Doom, stating "It simply isn't as good as any of the doom clones that there are around at the moment", and expresses that they think Dungeon Master II improves upon its predecessor, Dungeon Master.

References

External links

Dungeon Master II: The Legend of Skullkeep at the Hall of Light
Dungeon Master II: The Legend of Skullkeep at Dungeon Master Encyclopaedia

1993 video games
Amiga games
Amiga 1200 games
Cancelled Sega Genesis games
Classic Mac OS games
DOS games
Fantasy video games
First-person party-based dungeon crawler video games
FM Towns games
NEC PC-9801 games
Role-playing video games
Sega CD games
Single-player video games
Video game sequels
Video games developed in the United States
Video games scored by Allister Brimble
Video games scored by Tsukasa Tawada